The following is a list of albums released by record label Tommy Boy Records.

1980s

1983 
Jonzun Crew - Lost in Space
Planet Patrol - Planet Patrol

1984 
Force MDs - Love Letters
Jonzun Crew - Down to Earth

1985 
Various artists - Masters of the Beat
Various artists - Power Jam '85
Various artists - Tommy Boy: Greatest Beats

1986 
Afrika Bambaataa - Beware (The Funk Is Everywhere)
Afrika Bambaataa & Soulsonic Force - Planet Rock: The Album
Force MDs - Chillin'
Stetsasonic - On Fire

1987 
Force MDs - Touch and Go
TKA - Scars of Love

1988 
Information Society - Information Society
Stetsasonic - In Full Gear

1989 
Coldcut - What's That Noise? (Reprise)
De La Soul - 3 Feet High and Rising
Timmy Gatling - Help
Queen Latifah - All Hail the Queen

1990s

1990 
Digital Underground - Sex Packets
Force MDs - Step to Me
Information Society - Hack
Paris - The Devil Made Me Do It (Scarface)
TKA - Louder Than Love

1991 
De La Soul - De La Soul Is Dead
Digital Underground - Sons of the P
J.C. Lodge - Tropic of Love
Naughty by Nature - Naughty by Nature
Queen Latifah - Nature of a Sista'
Stetsasonic - Blood, Sweat & No Tears
Various artists - MTV Party to Go 1

1992 
De La Soul - De La Remix
Force MDs - For Lovers and Others: Force M.D.'s Greatest Hits
House of Pain - House of Pain
Information Society - Peace and Love, Inc.
TKA - Greatest Hits
Various artists - MTV Party to Go 2

1993 
De La Soul - Buhloone Mindstate
Digital Underground - The Body-Hat Syndrome
K7 - Swing Batta Swing
RuPaul - Supermodel of the World
Naughty by Nature - 19 Naughty III
Various artists - MTV Party to Go 3
Various artists - MTV Party to Go 4

1994 
Coolio - It Takes a Thief
House of Pain - Same as It Ever Was
Various artists - Big Blunts
Various artists - Jock Rock, Volume 1
Various artists - MTV Party to Go 5
Various artists - MTV Party to Go 6

1995 
Coolio - Gangsta's Paradise
Naughty by Nature - Poverty's Paradise
Various artists - Jock Jams, Volume 1
Various artists - Jock Rock, Volume 2
Various artists - MTV Party to Go 7
Various artists - MTV Party to Go 8
Various artists - New Jersey Drive, Vol. 1
Various artists - New Jersey Drive, Vol. 2

1996 
Above the Law - Time Will Reveal
Amber - This Is Your Night
Big Noyd - Episodes of a Hustla
De La Soul - Stakes Is High
House of Pain - Truth Crushed to Earth Shall Rise Again
L.V. - I Am L.V.
Meat Loaf - Live Around the World
Various artists - Jock Jams, Volume 2
Various artists - MTV Party to Go 9
Various artists - MTV Party to Go 10

1997 
Capone-N-Noreaga - The War Report
Coolio - My Soul
Jocelyn Enriquez - Jocelyn
Oran "Juice" Jones - Player's Call
Various artists - Jock Jams, Volume 3
Various artists - MTV Grind 1
Various artists - MTV Party to Go 1998
Various artists - MTV Party to Go Platinum Mix
Various artists - Nothing to Lose: Music from and Inspired by the Motion Picture

1998 
Above the Law - Legends
Defari— Focused Daily
Everlast - Whitey Ford Sings the Blues
Joydrop - Metasexual
Various artists - 54 (Music From The Miramax Motion Picture)
Various artists - Jock Jams, Volume 4
Various artists - MTV Party to Go 1999
Various artists - Ride (Music from the Dimension Motion Picture)

1999 
Amber - Amber
Badmarsh & Shri - Dancing DrumsHandsome Boy Modeling School - So... How's Your Girl?Naughty by Nature - Nature's FinestPrince Paul - A Prince Among ThievesSection 8 Mob - Guilty by Association (Dark City)
Shoestring - Representin' till the World Ends
Various artists - Get Crunk (Da Album)
Various artists - Jock Jams, Volume 5Various artists - Jock Rock 2000Various artists - MTV Party to Go 2000Various artists - WCW Mayhem: The Music 2000s 
 2000 
Amber - RemixedCapone-N-Noreaga - The ReunionSara von Davenport - Anointed Praise
De La Soul - Art Official Intelligence: Mosaic ThumpDiggin' in the Crates Crew - D.I.T.C.Everlast - Eat at Whitey'sShelly Gaines - The GiftPimpadelic - Southern DevilsScrewball - Y2K: The AlbumTony Touch - The Piece Maker 2001 
Afrika Bambaataa - Looking for the Perfect Beat: 1980–1985Coo Coo Cal - DisturbedCoolio - Fantastic Voyage: The Greatest HitsDe La Soul - AOI: BionixDigital Underground - No Nose Job: The Legend of Digital UndergroundInformation Society - strange haircuts // cardboard guitars // and computer samplesJoydrop - ViberateMasters at Work - Our Time is ComingRustic Overtones - ¡Viva Nueva!Various artists - Jock Jams: The All-Star Jock JamsVarious artists - MTV Party to Go Remixed 2002 
Amber - NakedForce MDs - Let Me Love You: The Greatest HitsSneaker Pimps - Bloodsport 2003 
Biz Markie - Weekend WarriorDe La Soul - The Best of De La SoulDigital Underground - Playwutchyalike: The Best of Digital UndergroundFannyPack - So StylisticMurk - MurkNaughty by Nature - Naughty's NicestThe Roc Project featuring Tina Novak - Never'

2004 
Afrika Bambaataa - Dark Matter Moving at the Speed of Light

2005 
FannyPack - See You Next Tuesday
Gucci Mane - Trap House
Tom & Joy - Antigua

2006 
Daniel Cirera - Honestly; I Love You *Cough*
Gucci Mane - Hard to Kill
Bob Sinclar - Western Dream (Defected/Ministry of Sound Australia)

2007 
2XL - Neighborhood Rapstar
The Cliks - Snakehouse
Ultra Naté - Grime, Silk, & Thunder

2008 
FannyPack - Ghetto Bootleg

2009 
Andy Caldwell - Obsession
The Cliks - Dirty King
Blake Lewis - Heartbreak on Vinyl
Plushgun - Pins & Panzers

2010s

2014 
Ghostface Killah - 36 Seasons

2015 
Method Man - The Meth Lab
Sheek Louch - Silverback Gorilla 2

2016 
Brookzill! - Throwback to the Future
Sadat X - Agua

References 

Discographies of American record labels
 
Tommy Boy Records